The Workers' Union (VMF) was a political party in the Faroe Islands.

History
The party won three seats in the 1994 elections, taken by Óli Jacobsen, Kristian Magnussen and Ingeborg Vinther. It joined the governing coalition, with Jacobsen, Magnussen and Axel H. Nolsøe serving as Ministers. However, it lost all three seats in the 1998 elections, when it received just 215 votes.

References

Defunct political parties in the Faroe Islands
Defunct socialist parties in Denmark
Socialism in the Faroe Islands